Vince Driver (7 January 1908 – 17 November 1970) was a former Australian rules footballer who played with Melbourne in the Victorian Football League (VFL).

Notes

External links 

1908 births
1970 deaths
Australian rules footballers from Victoria (Australia)
Melbourne Football Club players